Hosoi (written: 細井) is a Japanese surname. Notable people with the surname include:

Anette Hosoi, American engineer 
Christian Hosoi (born 1967), American skateboarder
, Japanese Confucianist
, Japanese ice hockey player
, Japanese Buddhist
, Japanese voice actor
, Japanese businessman

Japanese-language surnames